Isala punctata is a species of South Pacific crab spiders. It is the only species in the monotypic genus Isala. It was first described by Ludwig Carl Christian Koch in 1876, and is found in Australia.

See also
 List of Thomisidae species

References

Taxa named by Carl Ludwig Koch
Spiders of Australia
Spiders described in 1876

Thomisidae